Mount Lowe is a mountain peak located East of the head of Knight Inlet and SE of Devereux Lake, British Columbia, Canada. Nearby peaks include Mount Devereux, Village Cone, Barricade Mountain, Costello Peak, Obelisk Mountain, and Cornette Peak.

References

External link
 

Two-thousanders of British Columbia
Pacific Ranges
Range 2 Coast Land District